A mentalist is a performing artist or practitioner who simulates psychic abilities.

Mentalist may refer to:
Mentalism (psychology), a term for the study of mental perception and thought processes
The concept of mentalism in artificial intelligence, related to consciousness and mental state
British derogatory slang used to call a person insane, referring to a diminished state of cognition
The Mentalist, an American television series starring Simon Baker
The Mentalists, an English drama by Richard Bean

See also
Mentalism (disambiguation)